The Albatros D.VII was a German prototype single-seat fighter biplane flown in August 1917. It was powered by a water-cooled Benz Bz.IIIb V8 engine developing 145 kW (195 hp) and armed with two 7.92 mm (.312 in) machine guns. The D.VII had ailerons on both upper and lower wings linked by hinged struts.

The D.VII's performance was deemed an insufficient advance over existing aircraft to justify further development.

References
 Green, W. & Swanborough, G. (1994). The Complete Book of Fighters. London: Salamander Books.

External links 
 

Single-engined tractor aircraft
Biplanes
1910s German fighter aircraft
Military aircraft of World War I
D.07
Aircraft first flown in 1917